Maxine Pamela Ometa McClean is a Barbadian politician who served as her country's Minister of Foreign Affairs from 2008 to 2018.

Biography
McClean is a graduate of the University of the West Indies. While she was there she received second class honors in Public Administration. McClean was also a lecturer in the Department of Management Studies. In 1999, she established her own consulting firm.

A few years later, in January 2008, Maxine was invited to join the Barbados Cabinet as a minister in the Prime Minister's office. Eleven months after this, she was appointed as Minister of Foreign Affairs and Foreign Trade. McClean opened a new embassy in Brazil and appointed Yvette Goddard as the first ambassador of Barbados to Brazil in 2009. In the same year she addressed the General Assembly of the United Nations. In 2010 McClean opened Barbados' mission to Beijing, China, where Sir Lloyd Erskine Sandiford served as the first resident Ambassador to that country.

See also
List of foreign ministers in 2017
List of current foreign ministers

References

External links
Photo of Minister Senator Maxine McClean at the U.N.

 

Living people
Year of birth missing (living people)
Foreign Ministers of Barbados
21st-century Barbadian women politicians
21st-century Barbadian politicians
Government ministers of Barbados
Female foreign ministers
Democratic Labour Party (Barbados) politicians
University of the West Indies alumni
Ohio University alumni
Louisiana State University alumni